Wyoming Highway 158 (WYO 158) is a  Wyoming State Road located in eastern Goshen County from WYO 92 to the Nebraska state line.

Route description
Then WYO 158 turns east, passing farmland for its entirety, to head for the Nebraska state line. At , WYO 158 reaches the state line where the designation ends as well as the blacktop. WYO 158 ends at County Road 63. south of Lyman, Nebraska, and Nebraska Highway 92. The roadway continues east as Kiowa Church Road.

Major intersections

References

Official 2003 State Highway Map of Wyoming

External links 

Wyoming State Routes 100-199
WYO 158 - WYO 92 to Nebraska State Line

Transportation in Goshen County, Wyoming
158